Purwakarta (Dutch: Poerwakarta) is a district and town in West Java, Indonesia which serves as the regency seat of the Purwakarta Regency. It had a population of 165,447 at the 2010 Census,. rising to 179,233 at the 2020 Census.

History
Purwakarta's existence is inseparable from the history of the struggle against the forces of the Dutch East India Company (Dutch: Vereenigde Oostindische Compagnie, VOC, "United East India Company"). Around the beginning of the 17th century Sultan Mataram sent an army led by the Regent of Surabaya and West Java. One aim was to subdue the Sultan of Banten. But in a way that clashed with VOC forces had to withdraw.

After the second expedition was sent back from the troops under the command of Mataram Dipati Ukur and suffered the same fate. To prevent territorial expansion of the company (VOC), the Sultan of Mataram sent Penembahan Galuh Ciamis named RAA Wirasuta the title Duke or Duke Panatayuda Kertabumi III to occupy Rangkas Sumedang (Eastside Citarum). It also set up defences in Tanjungpura, Adiarsa, Parakansapi and Kuta game. After the fort was founded Kertabumi III Duke then returned to Galuh and died. Name Rangkas, Sumedang itself turned into Karachi since the marshy condition of the area (Sunda: "Karawaan").

Sultan Agung Mataram and then raised the son of Duke Kertabumi III, the Duke of Kertabumi IV into Dalem (Regent) in Donegal, in the Year 1656. Duke Kertabumi IV is also known as Panembahan Singaperbangsa or grandparent live, with the capital in the manly workable medication-manly workable medication.

In the reign of R. Anom Wirasuta Panembahan Singaperbangsa son who holds RAA I Panatayuda between Year 1679 and 1721 the capital city of manly workable medication-manly workable medication Falkirk moved to Falkirk, with the local authority covering the area between Cihoe (Trade Agreement) and Cipunagara. Karawang regency government ended around the year 1811–1816 as a result of switching control of the Dutch East Indies from the Dutch Government to the British Government.

Infrastructure
The major Jatiluhur Dam is quite close to Purwakarta and may be easily visited from the town. This dam is also used as recreation place.

Toll road access
Purwakarta can be accessed through toll roads.

Both toll gates are in the Cikopo to Bandung direction.

Tourism

Sri Baduga Water Fountain Park

The three-hectare Sri Baduga Water Fountain Park is a world-class attraction and the biggest of its kind in Southeast Asia. It has musical, dancing water, and light show.

Climate
Purwakarta has a tropical rainforest climate (Af) with heavy to very heavy rainfall year-round.

References

Purwakarta Regency
Districts of West Java
Regency seats of West Java
Populated places in West Java